Funing County is located in Wenshan Zhuang and Miao Autonomous Prefecture, in the east of Yunnan province, China. It is the easternmost county-level division of Yunnan, bordering Guangxi to the north, east and southeast, and Vietnam's Hà Giang Province to the south.

Administrative divisions
In the present, Funing County has 6 towns, 6 townships and 1 ethnic township. 
6 towns

6 townships

1 ethnic township
 Dongbo Yao

Ethnic groups

Ethnic groups of Funing County include the following. Population statistics are from 1990, and are sourced from the Funing County Ethnic Gazetteer  (1998).

Han Chinese (84,337 people)
Zhuang people (199,784 people, including the Buyang)
Min Zhuang
Dai Zhuang ("Dai Tho")
Yei Zhuang
Buyang people
Gelao people (121 people)
Yi people (11,249 people)
Miao people (24,414 people)
White Miao 
Lopsided Miao  (autonym:  
Red Miao 
Yao people (36,591 people)
Landian [Blue Indigo] Yao  (Kim Mun;)
Daban [Large Board] Yao  (Iu Mien;)
Shan [Mountain] Yao  ("Buya ";)

The Zheyuan  people of Dongbo  and Guichao , Funing County, are classified as ethnic Han (You 2013:290, 361-363). They numbered 1,033 persons as of 1960, and call themselves the "Yuexi people", while some also refer to themselves as the Buhong . The Zheyuan people migrated from Xuanhua County , Guangxi (currently the southern banks of the Yong River , in Nanning City, Guangxi) about 150 years ago. The Zheyuan people speak a Yue Chinese dialect.

Zhuang
The Funing County Ethnic Gazetteer (Lu and Nong 1998) identifies the following Zhuang subgroups.
Butu (布土)
Tianbao (天保)
Bu’ao (布傲)
Jiazhou (甲州)
Longjiang (龙降)
Mayang (麻央)
Yangwu (洋乌)
Buli (布俚)
Buyei (布越)
Long’an (隆安)
Buyang (布央)

Yi
According to the Funing County Ethnic Gazetteer 富宁县民族志 (1998), ethnic Yi numbered 11,249 as of 1991, or 3.15% of the total county population. The Zhuang exonym for the Yi is Bùměng 布孟 (also Měngrén 孟人).

There are 92 villages with ethnic Yi (in 38 administrative villages), consisting of 54 pure Yi villages and 38 ethnically mixed villages.

Ethnic Yi are found in the following villages of Funing County.
Xinhua Township 新华乡
Gedang Village 格当村
Banlun Township 板仑乡
Longyang Village 龙洋村
Longmai Village龙迈村
Mula 木腊
Zhegui 者归
Longzhong 龙中
Longxing 龙兴
Long'an 龙安
Lida Township 里达镇
Ligong Village 里拱村
Mulun Township 睦伦乡
Muyang Township 木央乡
Mengmei, Puyang Village 普阳村孟梅
Mushu Village 木树村
Musang, Daping Village 大坪村木桑
Mugang Village 木杠村
Tianpeng Township 田蓬镇

Climate

Transport
Nearest airport: Wenshan Airport

Historical sites
Liuyi Hall of Elders 六宜村老人亭
Poya Hall of Elders 坡芽村老人亭
Guichao Old Town 归朝古镇
The ancient village of Pingkun 坪坤村

References

Further reading
Hsiu, Andrew. 2014. "Mondzish: a new subgroup of Lolo-Burmese". In Proceedings of the 14th International Symposium on Chinese Languages and Linguistics (IsCLL-14). Taipei: Academia Sinica.
Wu Zili. 1994. A preliminary study of the Gasu language of Guangnan County, Yunnan Province [云南省广南县嘎苏话初探]. Minzu Yuwen 2.

External links
Funing County Official Website

County-level divisions of Wenshan Prefecture